Sefteh (also Romanized as Softeh; also known as Sefteh Galū and Sofeh) is a village in Kuh Panj Rural District, in the Central District of Bardsir County, Kerman Province, Iran. At the 2006 census, its population was 52, in 14 families.

References 

Populated places in Bardsir County